The Kingfisher Calendar was an annual calendar featuring models in swimsuits published by the Indian conglomerate United Breweries Group for 19 years from 2003 to 2021. Described by Rediff as "arguably the most prestigious [modelling assignment] in India", it was credited with advancing the careers of models and actresses like Katrina Kaif, Deepika Padukone, Yana Gupta, Sonali Raut, Ujjwala Raut, Nargis Fakhri, Bruna Abdullah, Deepti Gujral, Lisa Haydon,  Aishwarya Sushmita and Angela Jonsson. Photographer Atul Kasbekar has been associated with the calendar since its inception in 2003 till its final issue in 2021. Kasbekar along with  Vijay Mallya are credited with the idea of creating the annual Kingfisher Calendar.

Photographers, locations, models and production

Kingfisher Calendar Model Hunt

The Kingfisher Calendar Model Hunt, now known as Kingfisher Supermodels  is an annual competition to select a model for the annual calendar. Started in 2010, the competition has been televised by NDTV Good Times. The format includes competing 10 women in a reality show across 13 episodes.

Winners

 2010 – Himarsha Venkatsamy
 2011 – Angela Jonsson
 2012 – Nathalia Kaur
 2013 – Nevena Pejatovic
 2014 – Ketholeno Kense 
 2015 – Aastha Pokharel
 2016 – Aishwarya Sushmita

In popular culture
There is a 2015 Hindi film called Calendar Girls based on the Kingfisher Calendar phenomenon.

See also
India's Next Top Model
Pirelli Calendar

References 

Recurring events established in 2003
Indian reality television series
Modeling-themed reality television series
Promotional calendars
Annual publications
Swimsuits